Texoma Shore is the eleventh studio album by American country music singer Blake Shelton. The album was released on November 3, 2017 by Warner Bros. Records. Its lead single is "I'll Name the Dogs". As with his previous several albums, Scott Hendricks served as producer.

Content
The album is named after Lake Texoma, a lake on the border of Texas and Oklahoma. The lead single to the album is "I'll Name the Dogs", which was written by Josh Thompson, Ben Hayslip, and Matt Dragstrem. Shelton described the album to Entertainment Tonight by saying, "There's a song or two on there that are directly personal, but, you know, for the most part I just made an album that feels how I feel now – that's just happy and go with the flow."

Due to daily spins on iHeartMedia stations, five other tracks from the album all charted on Country Airplay dated for November 18, 2017: "At the House", "I Lived It", "Turnin' Me On", "Money", and "Why Me" all charted at numbers 33 through 37 for that chart. This made Shelton the first artist to have six songs in the top 60 of the chart at the same time, after Kenny Chesney and Lady Antebellum, who each charted seven tracks in 2004 and 2011 respectively.

Critical reception
Rating it 3 out of 4 stars, Glenn Gamboa of Newsday felt that Shelton's "charm is on full display". Cillea Houghton of Sounds Like Nashville wrote that he "embodies a sound that's grounded and down-to-earth, much like the beloved early hits that turned him into one of the genre's modern day staples." Matt Bjorke of Roughstock also reviewed the album with favor, saying that a "majority of the album feels ready for radio", while also highlighting his singing on "Why Me" and "Turnin' Me On".

Commercial performance
Texoma Shore debuted at number four on the US Billboard 200 with 63,000 album-equivalent units; 55,000 of that figure were pure album sales. It is Shelton's 11th US top 10 album. It has sold 257,100 copies in the United States as of April 2019.

Track listing

Personnel
Adapted from AllMusic

Jessi Alexander - background vocals
Perry Coleman - background vocals
Paul DiGiovanni - programming
Charles Dixon - violin, viola
Matt Dragstrem - acoustic guitar, electric guitar, percussion
Jeneé Fleenor - fiddle
Kenny Greenberg - baritone guitar, electric guitar
Troy Lancaster - electric guitar
Jamie Moore - synthesizer, whistle
Gordon Mote - Hammond B-3 organ, piano, synthesizer, Wurlitzer
Jimmy Olander - electric guitar on "I'll Name the Dogs"
Russ Pahl - pedal steel guitar
RaeLynn - background vocals
Sari Reist - cello
Blake Shelton - lead vocals
Jimmie Lee Sloas - bass guitar
Abe Stoklasa - background vocals
Bryan Sutton - banjo, acoustic guitar, mandolin
Ilya Toshinsky - banjo, bouzouki, 12-string guitar, acoustic guitar, resonator guitar, hi-string acoustic guitar
Mark Trussell - acoustic guitar, synthesizer bass, background vocals
Derek Wells - acoustic guitar, electric guitar
Craig Wiseman - acoustic guitar, background vocals
Nir Z. - drums, percussion, programming

Charts

Weekly charts

Year-end charts

Certifications

References

2017 albums
Blake Shelton albums
Warner Records albums
Albums produced by Scott Hendricks